Yuvalim is a community settlement in northern Israel. Located in the Galilee, it falls under the jurisdiction of Misgav Regional Council.

History
The village was established by a core group of Rafael employees and their families in 1982 on land that had been under the aegis of nearby Sakhnin prior to the advent of the state.

References

External links
Yuvalim's web site 
Misgav Regional Council 

Community settlements
Misgav Regional Council
Populated places in Northern District (Israel)
Hitahdut HaIkarim
Populated places established in 1982
1982 establishments in Israel